Lac La Blanche (French, meaning "White Lake") is a small lake located on the boundary between Mulgrave-et-Derry and Mayo, Quebec, Canada. The lake has three islands.

A  area between its eastern shores and Lac Britannique (Britannia Lake) is protected in the Forêt-la-Blanche Ecological Reserve. This area contains a rare old-growth forest and many endangered plant species.

Fish species: mostly Largemouth bass, Yellow Perch, Sunfish, Catfish, and trout.

See also
 List of lakes in Canada

References

Lakes of Outaouais